Daniel Lars Hoch (born 11 May 1979) is a Swedish former football player who played as a striker.

He moved from IF Brommapojkarna to AIK in 1997, where he got his senior debut. After nine seasons at AIK, he moved abroad to play for Danish Superliga club Aalborg BK (AaB) in January 2006. In his first months at AaB, he was recovering from an injury, and after only nine games and two goals, he left the club again in July 2006. He returned to Sweden to play for Assyriska FF. In 2007, he signed for Swedish Superettan-club IK Sirius where he scored 20 goals in two seasons. Despite of speculations about him leaving the club he signed a new contract in 2009.

Honours

Club 
AIK

 Allsvenskan: 1998
 Svenska Cupen: 1996–97, 1998–99

References

External links
 AaB profile
Career stats at Danmarks Radio

1979 births
Living people
Swedish footballers
Vasalunds IF players
IF Brommapojkarna players
AIK Fotboll players
AaB Fodbold players
Assyriska FF players
AFC Eskilstuna players
Allsvenskan players
Superettan players
Danish Superliga players
Swedish expatriate footballers
Expatriate men's footballers in Denmark
Swedish expatriate sportspeople in Denmark
IK Sirius Fotboll players
Association football forwards
Footballers from Stockholm